Stella Steyn (26 December 1907 – 21 July 1987) was an Irish artist.

Life and career
Steyn was born in Dublin in 1907 to William Steyn (a dentist) and Bertha Jaffe, who met and married in Limerick, having moved to Ireland from Akmenė, Lithuania. She was Jewish.

Steyn studied at Alexandra College and in 1924 the Dublin Metropolitan School of Art. In 1926, aged 18, in the company of her mother and fellow artist Hilda Roberts, she went to Paris to study at the Académie Scandinave and at La Grande Chaumière. She enrolled at the Bauhaus in Germany in 1931.

While in Paris she met Samuel Beckett, as well as James Joyce; the latter asked her to provide illustrations for his magnum opus, Finnegans Wake.

In 1928, she was awarded the Tailteann Silver Medal at the Metropolitan in Dublin. She also competed in the art competitions at the 1928 Summer Olympics.

In 1938, she married David Ross, a Professor of French at the University of London, whom she had met in Germany in 1933. They lived in England, where Ross worked as an academic in a number of universities.

Legacy

Little known in Ireland for many years, a retrospective exhibition of her work held at Dublin’s Gorry Gallery in 1995, and The Molesworth Gallery in 2001, renewed critical interest in her work.

One of her paintings, Still Life - Flowers, was displayed in the British Prime Minister's residence during the ministry of Gordon Brown, chosen by his wife, Sarah Brown. Her work can be seen at the Tatha Gallery in Fife, Scotland.

References

External links

1907 births
1987 deaths
Bauhaus alumni
Alumni of the National College of Art and Design
Irish Jews
20th-century Irish painters
Irish people of Lithuanian-Jewish descent
Lithuanian emigrants to Ireland
People educated at Alexandra College
Painters from Dublin (city)
Irish women painters
20th-century Irish women artists
Olympic competitors in art competitions